USS Groves may refer to:

 , a United States Navy destroyer escort cancelled during construction in 1944
 , a United States Navy guided-missile frigate in commission since 1982

See also

 
 

United States Navy ship names